Ng Kin-wai (born 6 September 1995) is a Hong Kong social activist and former member of the Yuen Long District Council for Kingswood North. He is currently convenor of the Tin Shui Wai Connection.

Biography
Raised in Yuen Long, Ng formed Tin Shui Wai Connection with other Tin Shui Wai netizens in 2019 aiming at contesting in the 2019 District Council election against the pro-Beijing incumbents.  Ng ran against pro-Beijing incumbent Lee Yuet-man in Kingswood North and received 4,371 votes, winning the seat by a narrow margin of 165 votes.

Ng ran in the pro-democracy primaries for the 2020 Legislative Council election in the New Territories West constituency. He came in fourth by receiving 20,525 votes, surpassing veteran and incumbent democrats was nominated as one of the six candidates in the general election.

Including Ng, at least 53 pro-democracy activists were arrested on 6 January 2021 morning over their organisation and participation in the primaries. Ng was released on bail on 7 January but his bail was then revoked in March.

References

1995 births
Living people
District councillors of Yuen Long District
Hong Kong democracy activists
Hong Kong localists
Tin Shui Wai Connection politicians
Prisoners and detainees of Hong Kong
Hong Kong political prisoners